Ruś may refer to the following places:
Ruś, Podlaskie Voivodeship, a village in Łomża County, north-eastern Poland
Ruś, Olsztyn County, a village in Warmian-Masurian Voivodeship, northern Poland
Ruś, Ostróda County, a village in Warmian-Masurian Voivodeship, northern Poland
Ruś, the Polish name for the Rus' (region) in Eastern Europe